Sandeep Pandey (born 22 July 1965) is an Indian social activist and the present General Secretary of the Socialist Party (India). He co-founded Asha for Education with Dr. Deepak Gupta (presently Professor at IIT Kanpur) and V.J.P Srivastava while working on his Ph.D. in Mechanical Engineering at the University of California, Berkeley. He has taught as a visiting professor at Indian Institute of Management Bangalore, Indian Institute of Management Ahmedabad, Indian Institute of Technology Gandhinagar, NALSAR University of Law and Indian Institute of Technology (BHU) Varanasi.

Early life
Pandey is an alumnus of the Institute of Technology, Banaras Hindu University (now Indian Institute of Technology (BHU) Varanasi). Thereafter he did his Master's in manufacturing and computer science from Syracuse University, followed by a doctorate in control theory at the University of California, Berkeley, which he completed in 1992.

Career
After completing his education, he moved back to India and started teaching at the Indian Institute of Technology Kanpur in 1992 and later founded a registered organisation named Asha Trust which currently has several centres/chapters across India. His team has launched a people's group named Asha Parivar in 2008 that focuses on strengthening democracy at the grassroots in Hardoi district of Uttar Pradesh.

Pandey's work at Asha Parivar is focused on Right to Information and other forms of citizen participation in removing corruption and improving the efficiency of governance. He leads the National Alliance of People's Movements (NAPM), the largest network of grassroots people's movements in India.

He was awarded the Ramon Magsaysay Award (often termed the 'Asian Nobel prize') in 2002 for the emergent leadership category. Pandey led an Indo-Pakistan peace march from New Delhi to Multan in 2005.

He has served as an adviser to the Indian government's Central Advisory Board for Education (CABE). His idea of education is based on empowerment by imbibing the spirit of co-operation instead of competition.

Sandeep Pandey's contract as a visiting faculty in the Chemical Engineering department at Indian Institute of Technology (BHU), Varanasi was prematurely terminated in January, 2016.

Statement issued by Sandeep Pandey after being sacked from IIT-BHU

Later in April 2016, the Allahabad High Court quashed the decision citing the violation of principal of natural justice.

In April, 2019 he launched his book titled "Mujhe Kashi Hindu Vishwavidyalaya Se Kyun Nikala Gaya" at New Delhi, Lucknow and Varanasi. This book throws light on the work he did during his stint as professor at IIT (BHU), the reasons and events leading to his expulsion and the elaborate Allahabad High Court judgement clearing him of all the false accusations resulting in his expulsion.

Controversies
In 2002, he attended the opening session of a conference organised by the Communist Party of India, Marxist Leninist Liberation, (CPI-MLL). Several prominent social activists, environmentalists, and writers-turned-activists like Mahashweta Devi, Arundhati Roy, Sandeep Pandey, Rajinder Sachar, Praful Bidwai, and Anand Patwardhan attended only the opening session of the six-day congress. Sandeep Pandey and other social activists did not attend the closing session in which the kin of about 1000 Naxalites who were killed in police action in Bihar were reportedly honoured.

Upon receiving the Ramon Magsaysay Award, he returned the cash portion of the award on being challenged to do so by a Philippine newspaper for his earlier remarks describing America as "the biggest terrorist state in the world." Pandey later clarified that he had never meant to criticise the people of the United States but its government.

In 2010, he visited Dantewada district in Chhattisgarh for a Jan Sunvayi (people's hearing) on atrocities by the local government. His visit was seemingly opposed by some members of local tribal community, where some local tribals were shown to be protesting against him and his team. It was said by Medha Patkar, that the protest was "stage managed" by the district administration officials themselves and the government was rousing the locals rural folk against the civil rights workers. Patkar also added that their team is not in favour of government responding to the violence perpetrated by Maoists by further violence by the state. She referred to Salwa Judum as an example of excesses by the state.

Personal life
Sandeep is the eldest of the three children of Sri U S Pandey who was an engineer in Railways and retired as member Railway Board. His younger brother Rahul who is  an IIT Kanpur and IIM Ahmedabad alumnus lives in Bengaluru. His sister Priyanka lives in USA.

Pandey lives in Indira Nagar, Lucknow, Uttar Pradesh. He is married to Arundhati Dhuru and has two children,Anandi Pandey.
He is a vegan and thus resents the consumption of milk and other dairy products.
He has campaigned along with school students of Shiksha Niketan and its principal, Dr. Brahmanand Mishra, in his home district of Ballia, against soft drink manufacturers .

See also
Right to Information Act

References

External links
Detailed Bio of Sandeep Pandey

Living people
20th-century Indian educational theorists
Banaras Hindu University alumni
Ramon Magsaysay Award winners
University of California, Berkeley alumni
Academic staff of IIT Kanpur
People from Ballia
Activists from Uttar Pradesh
1965 births
Syracuse University alumni